Bryan Adiak Rodríguez Torres (born 23 September 1996) is a Costa Rican-born Nicaraguan footballer who plays as a goalkeeper for AD Carmelita and the Nicaragua national team.

His father is Costa Rican and his mother is Nicaraguan.

References

External links
 

1996 births
Living people
People with acquired Nicaraguan citizenship
Nicaraguan men's footballers
Association football goalkeepers
Nicaragua international footballers
Nicaraguan people of Costa Rican descent
Costa Rican men's footballers
People from Alajuela
Costa Rican people of Nicaraguan descent
Liga FPD players
A.D. Carmelita footballers